is a district located in Okhotsk Subprefecture, Hokkaido, Japan.

As of 2004, the district has an estimated population of 38,013 and a population density of 25.37 persons per km2. The total area is 1,498.58 km2.

Memanbetsu Airport is located in the town of Ōzora; the airport was located in the town of Memanbetsu prior to the town's 2006 merger into the town of Ōzora.

Towns and villages
Bihoro Town
Ōzora Town (Previously Memanbetsu Town and Higashimokoto Village)
Tsubetsu Town

History
1869: 11 provinces and 86 districts were established in Hokkaido. Abashiri District was placed in Kitami Province
July 1881: Abashiri District (網尻郡) was incorporated from Kushiro Province
1947: Abashiri Town split into Higashimokoto Village and Abashiri City; Abashiri City leaves the district
March 31, 2006: the town of Memanbetsu, and the village of Higashimokoto merged to form the new town of Ōzora.

Districts in Hokkaido